Adolfo Ferrari (20 September 1924 – 30 November 1998) was an Italian cyclist. He competed in the individual and team road race events at the 1948 Summer Olympics.

References

External links
 

1924 births
1998 deaths
Italian male cyclists
Olympic cyclists of Italy
Cyclists at the 1948 Summer Olympics
Cyclists from the Province of Cremona